Idiocerini is a tribe of leafhoppers in the family Cicadellidae, formerly treated as a subfamily, but now included within the subfamily Eurymelinae, and containing over 60 genera.

Selected Genera
 Barolineocerus Freytag, 2008
 Idiocerus Lewis, 1834

References

Eurymelinae
Cicadellidae